Martell T. Webb (born November 10, 1989) is a former American football tight end. He played his college football for the Michigan Wolverines football team. He was previously a highly rated tight end and wide receiver for Pontiac Northern High School who was selected to the 2006 USA Today All-USA second-team.

He has also been a member with the Philadelphia Eagles, New York Jets, Tampa Bay Buccaneers, Arizona Cardinals, Detroit Lions, Indianapolis Colts and Cleveland Browns.

High school
Webb was rated the 17th best high school football tight end in the class of 2007 by Scout.com. He was rated as the 29th and 56th best wide receiver by Rivals.com and ESPN.com. He was selected to the 2006 USA Today All-USA second-team as a tight end along with fellow Michigan matriculant Ryan Mallett.

College
During his Michigan career, he posted a total of 9 receptions for 111 yards and 2 touchdowns as well as 3 special teams tackles. He started three games during his career, backing up Kevin Koger, Mike Massey and Carson Butler. His touchdown in the October 9, 2010 against Michigan State in the Paul Bunyan Trophy game gave Michigan its final lead of the game.

Professional career
On July 26, 2011, he was signed by the Philadelphia Eagles. He posted one reception in the August 11 preseason game against the Baltimore Ravens. He was released by the Eagles on August 29. He worked out with the Denver Broncos. He was signed by the New York Jets on September 27 and released on October 4. He was signed to the Tampa Bay Buccaneers practice squad on December 7, 2011, and released on December 19. On January 5, 2012, Webb signed a 'reserve/future' contract with the Arizona Cardinals. He was released from the team on August 31, 2012. On November 13, 2012, he was signed to the Indianapolis Colts' practice squad, but the team released him on December 4.

On December 12, the Tennessee Titan's signed Webb to its practice squad. On August 26, 2013, he was waived by the Titans. He was signed by the Lions and assigned to the practice squad on November 5, 2013. The Lions released him on November 19. On November 28, he was signed to the practice squad by the Indianapolis Colts.

Webb signed with the Cleveland Browns on August 5, 2014. The Browns released Webb on August 25, 2014.

Notes

External links
 Official bio at Michigan
 Webb (college stats) at ESPN.com
 Webb at NCAA

1989 births
Living people
African-American players of American football
American football tight ends
American football wide receivers
Arizona Cardinals players
Michigan Wolverines football players
New York Jets players
Sportspeople from Pontiac, Michigan
Philadelphia Eagles players
Players of American football from Michigan
Tampa Bay Buccaneers players
Indianapolis Colts players
Cleveland Browns players
21st-century African-American sportspeople
20th-century African-American people